Christos Gantzoudis (born 2 December 1973) is a retired Greek football midfielder.

References

1973 births
Living people
Greek footballers
Kallithea F.C. players
Apollon Smyrnis F.C. players
Kalamata F.C. players
Panegialios F.C. players
Thyella Patras F.C. players
Association football midfielders
Super League Greece players